Leonard Ostrovsky (April 28, 1922 – March 1973) was a member of the Ohio House of Representatives.

References

Democratic Party members of the Ohio House of Representatives
1922 births
1973 deaths
20th-century American politicians